Galium hardhamiae is a species of flowering plant in the coffee family Rubiaceae, known by the common name Hardham's bedstraw. The scientific name may be misspelled Galium hardhamae. It is endemic to the Santa Lucia Range of southern Monterey County and northern San Luis Obispo County in California. It is a member of the serpentine soils flora in these coastal mountains. This is a perennial herb forming mats or clumps of stems no more than 30 centimeters long. The stems have many whorls of six fleshy green leaves, each leaf just 1 to 3 millimeters long. The inflorescences, clusters of yellow-green to pinkish flowers, appear in leaf axils.

References

External links
Jepson Manual Treatment
USDA Plants Profile
Photo gallery

hardhamiae
Endemic flora of California
Plants described in 1962
Flora without expected TNC conservation status